Panic Blooms is the seventh studio album by American electronic band Black Moth Super Rainbow. It was released on May 4, 2018 under Rad Cult Records.

Critical reception
Panic Blooms was met with "generally favorable" reviews from critics. At Metacritic, which assigns a weighted average rating out of 100 to reviews from mainstream publications, this release received an average score of 72, based on 7 reviews. Aggregator Album of the Year gave the release a 73 out of 100 based on a critical consensus of 5 reviews.

Track listing

On October 18, 2019, an alternate version of the album titled Panic Fades was released on CD under Rad Cult Records. In addition to two exclusive bonus tracks, the Panic Blooms tracks are slowed down to 75% the original speed to simulate a vinyl listening experience.

Charts

References

2018 albums
Black Moth Super Rainbow albums